Catocala deuteronympha is a moth of the family Erebidae. It is found from eastern Siberia to Japan and Korea.

The length of the forewings is about 27 mm.

It orients vertically when resting on tree trunks.

Subspecies 
 Catocala deuteronympha deuteronympha
 Catocala deuteronympha dahurica Klyuchko, 1992
 Catocala deuteronympha omphale Butler, 1881 (South-eastern Siberia and Japan)
 Catocala deuteronympha tschiliensis Bang-Haas, 1927

References

External links 
 Image
 Species info
 Catocala deuteronympha dahurica Images

deuteronympha
Moths of Asia
Moths described in 1861